Gastroplakaeis forficulatus is a moth species in the family of Lasiocampidae found in Ghana and Gabon.

Related pages
List of moths of Ghana
List of moths of Gabon

References

External links

Moths of Africa
Lasiocampinae